Desafío is a Colombian reality competition television series produced by Caracol TV. In the show, contestants are isolated in an island and compete for cash and other prizes.  The show uses a system of progressive elimination, allowing the contestants to vote off other members until only one final contestant remains and wins a cash prize.

Although the show has been mostly produced by Caracol TV, other versions have been produced by GenTV and Univision. These two versions were produced in Florida and aimed to the Latin American audience in the United States.

Format

Groups
Contestants are split in different groups of usually six to eight people each. The criteria for the division might vary from season to season. Some criteria used have been whether they had been in a previous season ("Sobrevivientes", and "Superhumanos"), if they were famous ("Celebridades"), age ("Cuchacos", "Pelados", and "Catanos"), social status ("Privilegiados", "Rebuscadores", and, "Llevados"), or where they came from ("Antioqueños", "Cachacos", "Cafeteros", "Costeños", "Emigrantes", "Santandereanos", and "Vallecaucanos")

Each group is given a unique name and an identifying color. These are used on flags, challenge courses, on-screen text and various other items. Each player is given an assortment of clothes with their respective colors and symbols. Players are required to wear the color of their group in a visible location at all times, allowing the audience to identify their affiliation. Upon switching groups (due to a merge or dissolution), players are required to give up their old clothes and obtain new ones in the new group's color.

Locations and beaches
Each group is assigned a different beach to stay. Each beach has different qualities and benefits:
 Playa Alta/Oro has a luxurious cabin with beds, showers, bathrooms and a fully equipped kitchen. In some occasions, there are employees that prepare the meals for each contestant.
 Playa Media/Plata features the bare necessities for living. Contestants have a wooden roof with hammocks to sleep. They are given pots and pans, knives, some food and tools to hunt and cook.
 Playa Baja/Bronce features the worst conditions for the contestants to live in. Contestants have to build their own shelter or sleep in a cave. There is no food and the contestants have to eat fruits or try to hunt or fish what they can.
During each show, the groups have to compete in a challenge ("Desafío territorial") to decide which group will stay on each beach.
As the show progresses and contestants are eliminated, the teams are merged into a single group and they are taken to Playa Fusión, which features commodities slightly better than Playa Media.

Challenges
During each show, teams will play three separate challenges. The challenges are:
 Desafío Territorial where the winning group receives the "keys" to "Playa Alta". The second and third place teams get the "keys" to "Playa Media" and "Playa Baja" respectively.
 Desafío de Salvación 
Desafío de Salvacion where the winning team gains immunity from elimination, plus, in some seasons, the chance to be judges at the final "juicio" or judgment.
Desafío a Muerte where the losing team is sent to "Juicio" to have one of their members eliminated.
Challenges vary from obstacle courses, to races, swimming matches, building puzzles, among many others.

El Juicio
"Juicio" (or "Judgment") is held after the ‘Desafío de Salvación’. Here, the group that lost the "Desafío Final" vote one person out of their team. Present at the judgment is the team that won the "Desafío de Salvación", who will serve as the judges. After a brief discussion of the events that led to that moment, each member of the losing team walks up to a table and secretly votes to eliminate a member of his team. After all members of the team have voted, the host counts the votes.

Originally, the judges voted to save a member of the other team. The strategy usually was to try to anticipate who the losing team would want to eliminate and save him/her. The next member with the most votes would then be eliminated. In 2008, the rules were changed and the judges were given the option to veto the choice of the other team to eliminate a member. If they veto, the losing team is forced to vote publicly for a second member to be eliminated. This is referred to as the "bloody vote". In 2009, a new rule was made. The losing team voted to eliminate a member of their team. Then, a second voting has to be done to choose a second member to be eliminated. Then, the judges decide which of the two "sentenced" members was eliminated.

In the event of ties, sometimes the judges get to choose which of the members of the losing team that are involved in the tie, is eliminated. Also, the members that are chosen to be eliminated are sometimes given a chance to vouch in front of the judges for their safety.

End of the game and prizes
When there are two contestants left in the game, they return to Colombia for one last show, along with the eliminated contestants. Here, the audience votes for the contestant they want to win the game. In 2008, the system was changed and it was the other contestants who voted for the winner. The winning contestant usually gets a prize in cash whereas the second place contestant gets a new car.

The Box format
The COVID-19 pandemic and its effects forced changes in the show's format starting from 2020, with the edition scheduled for that year having its production postponed until further notice. Given the worldwide travel restrictions triggered by the pandemic, in early 2021 the reality's production staff decided to stage the show within Colombia, building a special complex for that purpose which would work as a bubble to ensure the adequate biosecurity conditions for contestants and staff.

In The Box, three teams (Alpha, Beta, and Gamma) of eight (four men and four women) led by a captain are made from eleven original groups of four contestants (two men and two women) after a first challenge, while an additional team (Omega) is later made up of contestants who were not originally selected by the respective team captains, who participate in a special challenge to get the chance to join this last team. Unlike other previous editions of the show in which teams would have to win the right to stay at the best territory in each cycle, in this format the four teams are assigned a house to stay until the team dissolves or merges, all of which have the same qualities and benefits such as public services, a fully equipped kitchen with supplies, beds, showers, bathrooms, furniture, grill, a swimming pool and a gym, which they will progressively lose if teams fail to win the different challenges, to the point those houses will be akin to the Playa Baja/Bronce of previous editions.

During each cycle, five separate challenges are played at five different arenas or boxes: Blue (for water-themed challenges), Red (for contact-themed challenges), Yellow (for ground-based, military-style challenges), White/Rainbow (for air-themed challenges in which contestants may not touch the floor) and Black (for elimination challenges). The challenges teams have to play in every cycle are:
 Desafío de Sentencia y Hambre (Sentence and Hunger Challenge), where the winning team gets to select one or two contestants from any team (even their own) to participate in the cycle's "Desafío a Muerte" and also keep all the food they have been supplied with at the beginning of the cycle. The second team gets to choose a food item from an offered selection and the remaining teams are left without any food for the remainder of the cycle.
 Desafío de Sentencia y Servicios (Sentence and Services Challenge), where the winning team gets to select one or two contestants to participate in the cycle's "Desafío a Muerte" and also keep all of their house's public services (water, electricity, gas) running as normal. The second team gets to choose one of those services while the rest are cut, and the remaining teams get all of their public services cut for the remainder of the cycle.
 Desafío de Sentencia y Bienestar (Sentence and Wellness Challenge), where the winning team also gets to select contestants for the "Desafío a Muerte" as well as keep all of their house's amenities (beds, furniture, pool, gym) in place. The team placing second gets to choose one of those amenities, and the third and fourth-placed teams are deprived of all amenities.
 Desafío de Sentencia, Premio y Castigo (Sentence, Prize and Punishment Challenge), where the winning team gets to select the last contestants for the "Desafío a Muerte" and is also entitled to get a prize and select another team to get a punishment.
 Desafío a Muerte (Death Challenge), where the contestants who were sentenced after the cycle's other four challenges play to avoid being eliminated. The ones to come in last place are eliminated.
The Black "box" is only used for the Desafío a Muerte, while the other challenges alternate around the remaining four boxes every cycle. Challenges vary from obstacle courses, to races, swimming matches, building puzzles, among many others.

As in previous editions, the teams dissolve and reconfigure as the cycles progress until the last eight contestants (four men and four women) are merged and play a semi-final challenge, separated by gender. At the end of the show, a male contestant and a female one are declared as winners.

Participants

Desafío 2004 - La Aventura

Desafío 2005 - Cabo Tiburón, Colombia

Desafío 2006 - La guerra de los estratos

Desafío 2007 - La Guerra de las Generaciones

Desafío 2008 - La Lucha de las Regiones

Desafío 2009 - La Lucha de las Regiones, La Revancha

Desafío 2010 - La Lucha de las Regiones, el Brazalete Dorado

Desafío 2011 - La Lucha de las Regiones, La Piedra Sagrada

Desafío 2012 - El Fin Del Mundo

Desafío 2013 - África, El Origen

Desafío 2014 - Marruecos, Las Mil y Una Noches

Desafío 2015 - India, La Reencarnación

Desafío 2016 - Súper Humanos, Súper Regiones

Desafío 2017 - Súper Humanos, Cap Cana

Desafío 2018 - Súper Humanos XV

Desafío 2019 - Súper Regiones

Desafío 2021 - The Box

Desafío 2022 - The Box 2

Seasons
The Colombian version is produced by Caracol TV and has been hosted by several celebrities. Each competition has a unique name, and lasts from 13 to 15 episodes.

International versions
Although the main version of Desafío is produced by Caracol TV for Colombian television, three other versions have been produced already.

 Currently airing  
 No longer airing  
 Upcoming or returning version

See also
 Expedición Róbinson (Colombia)
 Survivor (U.S. TV series)

Notes

References

External links
 Official website

2004 Colombian television series debuts
Caracol Televisión original programming
Colombian reality television series
Reality competition television series